The post conflict South Sudan has huge challenges in delivering health care to the population. The challenges include: crippled health infrastructures, nearly collapsed public health system, and inadequate qualified health professionals. The country is far from achieving the MDGs by end of 2015. The health system needs a major resuscitation, in addition to supporting and developing health training institutions.

South Sudan is acknowledged to have some of the worst health indicators in the world.

A new measure of expected human capital calculated for 195 countries from 1990 to 2016 and defined for each birth cohort as the expected years lived from age 20 to 64 years and adjusted for educational attainment, learning or education quality, and functional health status was published by The Lancet in September 2018. South Sudan had the second lowest level of expected human capital countries with 2 health, education, and learning-adjusted expected years lived between age 20 and 64 years. This was an improvement over 1990 when its score was 1.

Health system
South Sudan has a health system structured with three tiers: Primary Health Care Units (PHCU), Primary Health Care Centers (PHCC) and Hospitals (which exist as either state, county, police or military). The structures in health services delivery is in the order of community, primary, secondary and tertiary levels. The community is located at the village level and manned by community health. The primary level includes Primary Health Care Units and Primary Health Care Centers which provide Basic Package of Health Services (BPHS). The BPHS covers preventive, curative, health promotion and managerial activities. The BPHS is financed by the government and contributions from MDTF and various NGO. The health services are meant to be free and accessible to the majority of the population at the primary and secondary levels.
The national ministry of health (MoH) have a decentralized health services in line with the interim constitution of South Sudan (2005) and local government act (2009).
The decentralized organization structure has four levels: Central, state, county and the community. 
The national ministry of health provides policy guidance, leadership, funding, monitoring and evaluation. The state level oversees the implementation of health care services delivery at the rest of the levels.

Health indicators
The health situation South Sudan is far from ideal. More than 50% of the population live below the poverty line, and the adult literacy rate is at 27%.  The under-five infant mortality rate is 135.3 per 1,000 (under five mortality rate (U5MR) 99/1000 live births), whilst maternal mortality is the highest in the world at 2,053.90 per 100,000 live births (Maternal Mortality Ratio (MMR) at 2045/100,000 live births in 2006 (South Sudan national bureau of statistics, 2012)). Antenatal care (ANC) attendance (1st visit) was 47.6%, 17% for four visits. and the infant mortality rate (IMR) was at 64/1,000 live births. The life expectancy is 55 years. In 2004, there were only three surgeons serving southern Sudan, with three proper hospitals, and in some areas there was just one doctor for every 500,000 people.
A child born in South Sudan has a 25% chance of dying before their 5th birthday. The major causes of the mortality include pneumonia, diarrhea, malaria, and malnutrition. 
The country has the lowest immunization coverage of only 26%. The proportion of children who received all recommended vaccinations dropped from 27 to 26% in 2006 and 2010 respectively.
The ANC coverage is very low at 40.3% women attending first visit and 17% women who completed the four recommended visit. Most of the maternal deaths occur during labor, delivery and the immediate postpartum period. Most of these deaths would have been prevented if the country had good infrastructure and skilled personnel during child birth. 
The human resource for health in South Sudan is far below the minimum threshold recommended by the WHO. Between 2009–2010 there were only 189 doctors across eight states with one doctor for every 65,574 people. There were 309 midwives in the country and the ratio was 1 per 39,088 population. However, there is variation in the figures; other sources suggested the ratio of midwives as 1:125,000 women.

2014 famine
In October 2014 Reuters reported that Oxfam was warning that "2.2 million people currently faced starvation".

2017 famine

References